Sandro Miller (born in 1958) is an American photographer, (working professionally as "Sandro"), known for his expressive images, his close work with actor John Malkovich and the other ensemble members of Chicago’s Steppenwolf Theatre Company.

Career
In 2001, the Cuban government invited Sandro to photograph their Olympic athletes. This project was the first US/Cuban collaboration since the trade embargo was imposed in 1960.

Sandro shoots all the promotional photography for Dance for Life, the Midwest's largest performance-based AIDS fundraiser. He also sits on the board of directors for the Museum of Contemporary Photography and is a member of the Chicago Arts Club.

In 2014, Sandro re-created 41 photographs paying homage to the world's greatest photographers in a project titled "Malkovich, Malkovich, Malkovich: Homage to Photographic Masters", using John Malkovich as the subject in each image.

Awards
At the Cannes Lions International Festival of Creativity in July 2011, Sandro was acknowledged with a Saatchi & Saatchi Best New Director Award for his short video “Butterflies” featuring John Malkovich. For the past five years, in juried competition within the industry, Sandro has been voted one of the top 200 advertising photographers in the world.

Sandro traveled to Morocco in November 2013 and shot portraits of 230 local tradesmen, nomadic people, snake charmers, fossil diggers, and Gnawa musicians.

On November 2, 2014, in Carnegie Hall, the Lucie Foundation honored Sandro with the “International Photographer of the Year Award” for his achievements in photography.

On October 27, 2015, for the 2nd year in a row, Sandro was honored with the Lucie Foundation’s “International Photographer of the Year Award” for his photography of the "Malkovich, Malkovich, Malkovich: Homage to Photographic Masters" images.

On October 23, 2016, in Carnegie Hall, The International Photography Awards named Sandro the 2016 Advertising Photographer of the Year for his “Advantage Humans” campaign shot for the American Cancer Society.

In November 2016, Sandro's short film "Hell" starring John Malkovich was named the grand-prize winner of the International Motion Art Awards at the annual AI-AP Big Talk event.

Books by Sandro Miller
 (1994) I Can't Accept Not Trying
 (1998) American Bikers
 (2002) Sandro: Figure E Ritratti
 (2008) Imagine Cuba 1999-2007
 (2009) El Matador, Joselito: A Pictorial Novel
 (2012) Sandro Raw, Steppenwolf
 (2014) Eyes of Morocco
 (2015) Finding Freedom
 (2016) The Malkovich Sessions
 (2016) Dance for Life

Exhibitions
Between October 2002 and January 2003 Sandro had a solo retrospective exhibition of his personal work in the Scavi Scaligeri International Center for Photography in Verona, Italy.
From October 2 through December 2010 Sandro had a gallery exhibition of 36 of his Cuban photographs, including a previously unexhibited series of black-and-white portraits of elderly Cubans, at the Chicago Cultural Center.
From October 2 through November 3, 2012, Sandro had a solo exhibition at the Safety-Kleen Gallery at Elgin Community College titled "Provocative Imperfections". The show featured Sandro’s “Cuban Portraits”, his “Massa” images and a selection from his “Butts & Fronts” project.
From March 21 through August 2013 Sandro had a solo exhibition titled “Seen/Unseen” at Loyola University School of Communications in Chicago.  “Seen/Unseen” is a collection of Sandro's personal work spanning the last 25 years.  Images from his projects American Bikers, Atropa, Cuban Portraits, Massa, and his latest project Peering In: Images of an Over Stimulated Society, were on view.
On July 6, 2015, an exhibition of 41 images from Sandro’s Malkovich, Malkovich, Malkovich: Homage to Photographic Masters project opened at the Rencontres de la Photographie d'Arles in the south of France.
From June 2 through August 28, 2016, Sandro had an exhibition at The Lumiere Brothers Center for Photography in Moscow, Russia.  The exhibition will feature his Malkovich, Malkovich, Malkovich: Homage to Photographic Masters images. In addition to the homage images, 3 short films and several other images that Sandro created of John during their 20-year collaboration will be shown.
From October 13 through December 4, 2016, Sandro had an exhibition at the Krasnoyarsk Museum Center, Krasnoyarsk, Russia. The exhibition will feature Sandro's Malkovich, Malkovich, Malkovich: Homage to Photographic Masters images along with 3 of his short films.

General references
The New Yorker, AN AMERICAN ATTITUDE, By Alec Wilkinson, July 10, 1995  
Chicago Reader, Art: A Different Perspective by Tori Marlan, July 20, 2007  
 Sandro Miller: HuffPost Arts & Culture American Biker Series (http://www.huffingtonpost.com/2012/10/15/sandro-millers-american-bikers_n_1966711.html)
 Chicago Tribune: Sandro Miller Does All Malkovich (http://www.chicagotribune.com/entertainment/ct-john-malkovich-sandro-miller-photos-20141105-column.html#page=1)

References

External links

 
 Sandro Miller: International Motion Art Awards (http://www.ai-ap.com/publications/article/8633/international-motion-art-awards-sandro-miller.html) 
 Sandro Miller: Butterflies Video with John Malkovich (https://www.youtube.com/watch?v=Ez1xl878xI0)
 Still Image Master Moves to Film: Sandro Miller; Part 1 (http://diy-film.com/2011/10/12/still-image-master-moves-to-film-sandro-miller-part-1/)  Part 2 (http://diy-film.com/2011/10/21/still-image-master-moves-to-film-sandro-miller-part-2/)
 Inspire first Gallery: American Bikers (http://www.inspirefirst.com/2012/10/11/american-bikers-sandro-miller/)
 RGG EDU: Interview with Sandro Miller (https://www.youtube.com/watch?v=GHsHA87cWe0)
 Artist Talk with Catherine Edelman: (http://vimeo.com/113446147)

American photographers
Living people
1958 births